The women's mass start competition in speed skating  at the 2022 Winter Olympics was held on 19 February, at the National Speed Skating Oval ("Ice Ribbon") in Beijing. Irene Schouten of the Netherlands won the event, her third gold and fourth overall medal at these Olympics. Ivanie Blondin of Canada won her first individual Olympic medal, the silver. Francesca Lollobrigida of Italy won the bronze medal.

The defending champion was Nana Takagi. She entered the competition, but fell in her semifinal and did not qualify to the final. The silver medalist, Kim Bo-reum, and the bronze medalist, Schouten, qualified for the Olympics as well. Marijke Groenewoud was the 2021 World Single Distances champion in mass start, with Blondin and Schouten being the silver and bronze medalists, respectively. Blondin was leading the 2021–22 ISU Speed Skating World Cup in mass start with three events completed before the Olympics, followed by Lollobrigida, Guo Dan, and Elizaveta Golubeva.

Qualification

A total of 24 entry quotas were available for the event, with a maximum of two athletes per NOC. All 24 athletes qualified through their performance at the 2021–22 ISU Speed Skating World Cup.

The qualification time for the event (2:10.00 (1500 m)) was released on July 1, 2021, and was unchanged from 2018. Skaters had the time period of July 1, 2021 – January 16, 2022 to achieve qualification times at valid International Skating Union (ISU) events.

Results

Semifinals

Final

References

Women's speed skating at the 2022 Winter Olympics